Ex Machina is a 2014 science fiction film written and directed by Alex Garland in his directorial debut. There are four significant characters, played by Domhnall Gleeson, Alicia Vikander, Sonoya Mizuno, and Oscar Isaac. In the film, programmer Caleb Smith (Gleeson) is invited by his CEO (Issac) to administer the Turing test to an intelligent humanoid robot (Vikander).

Made on a budget of $15 million, Ex Machina grossed $36 million worldwide and received critical acclaim. The National Board of Review recognised Ex Machina as one of the ten best independent films of the year and at the 88th Academy Awards the film won the award for Best Visual Effects and additionally was nominated for Best Original Screenplay. At the 69th British Academy Film Awards and at the British Independent Film Awards 2015, Ex Machina received five nominations each and won four awards at the latter ceremony. Vikander's performance earned her Golden Globe Award, BAFTA Award, European Film Award and Saturn Award nominations as well as several critic award wins.

Accolades

References

External links
 

Lists of accolades by film